Rockwatch is the junior club of the Geologists' Association, and has been established under its auspices in November 2001. It is, however, run independently from the parent body.

Magazine
Rockwatch publishes a full colour magazine three times a year. Each issue is full of geological articles, many of them cutting-edge science, as well as activities and puzzles.

Field trips
Field trips take place throughout the UK, and give members the chance to meet eminent geologists, as well as collect fossils and minerals. Parents/guardians are required to accompany their children.

See also 
 Geologists' Association
 South Wales Geologists' Association

References

External links 

 

Scientific organizations established in 2001
Geology societies
Geologists' Association
2001 establishments in the United Kingdom
Scientific organisations based in the United Kingdom
Youth organisations based in the United Kingdom
Youth science